The Greece national cricket team is the team that represents the country of Greece in international cricket. The side is organised by the Hellenic Cricket Federation, which became an affiliate member of the International Cricket Council (ICC) in 1995 and an associate member in 2017.

Greece made its international debut at the 1990 European Cricketer Cup in Guernsey, and has participated regularly in European Cricket Council tournaments since then. Cricket in the country is played mainly on the island of Corfu. This strong cricket tradition is due to the 50 years British rule of the Ionian islands at the time of the liberation of Greece from the Ottoman Empire. Efforts are currently underway to expand the game further outside Corfu.

History

The Greek cricket team appeared in every edition of the ECC Trophy from 1999 to 2005, hosting and winning the tournament in 1999. This enabled them to play in Division Two of the European Championship in 2000, finishing in sixth place. They once again played in the tournament in 2006, but this time they met with controversy. After winning all three of their first round group games, they looked to be a favourite for the tournament, and promotion to Division One. However, it was revealed that they had fielded two ineligible players and their wins were cancelled. Then they opted not to travel to RAF Lossiemouth to play Israel in the eighth place play-off, despite being fully aware that this would forfeit that game, and relegate them.

In September 2009 Greece took part in the 2009 European Cricket Championship Division Five in Corfu, Greece. The national team won the event with five wins out the five games .

2018-Present
In April 2018, the ICC decided to grant full Twenty20 International (T20I) status to all its members. Therefore, all Twenty20 matches played between Greece and other ICC members after 1 January 2019 will be a full T20I. 

Greece played their first T20I on 15 October 2019, against Serbia, during the 2019 Hellenic Premier League.

International Grounds

Tournament history

European Cricket Championship
2000: 6th place (Division Two)
2006: Disqualified (Division Two)
2009: 1st place (Division Five) 
2011: 6th place (Division Two) 
2012: 5th place (Division 2)
2014: 4th place (Division 3)
The last squad to participate in Division 3 is as follows:
 Anastasios Manousis( Captain)
 Spiros Bogdos
 Spiros Gasteratos
 Spiros Goustis
 Alexandros Grammenos 
 Nasos Karakantas
 Andrew Koutsoufis
 Alex Lagos
 Christos Molinaris
 Othonas Nikitas
 Spiros Nikokavoura
 Alexandros Souvlakis
 Dimitris Triantafillidis
 Ioannis Vasilas
Stylianos Goustis (Team Manager)

In 2012 the European T20 Championship was held in Corfu. Hellas were captained by former Hampshire wicket-keeper Nic Pothas.

Records and Statistics 

International Match Summary — Greece
 
Last updated 18 July 2022

Twenty20 International 
 Highest team total: 157/8 v Romania on 24 June 2021 at National Sports Academy, Sofia.
 Highest individual score: 61, Aslam Mohammad v Romania on 24 June 2021 at National Sports Academy, Sofia.
 Best individual bowling figures: 3/12, Spyridon Bantzas v Bulgaria on 16 October 2019 at Marina Ground, Corfu.

T20I record versus other nations

Records complete to T20I #1670. Last updated 18 July 2022.

See also
 List of Greece Twenty20 International cricketers

References

External links
Official site

Cricket in Greece
National cricket teams
Cricket
Greece in international cricket